The Smilin' Kid is a 1920 American short silent Western film directed by and featuring Hoot Gibson.

Cast
 Hoot Gibson
 Dorothy Wood
 Lucille Rubey credited as Lucille Ruby
 Mary Royce
 Jim Corey

See also
 Hoot Gibson filmography

External links
 

1920 films
1920 Western (genre) films
1920 short films
American silent short films
American black-and-white films
Films directed by Hoot Gibson
Silent American Western (genre) films
1920s American films
1920s English-language films